Tetrabothriidea is an order of helminths in the class Cestoda. It consists of only one family, Tetrabothriidae. Their hosts are mainly seabirds, the rest being cetaceans and pinnipeds.

Genera
All of the genera of Tetrabothriidea are in the family Tetrabothriidae.
 Anophryocephalus Baylis, 1922
 Chaetophallus Nybelin, 1916
 Priapocephalus Nybelin, 1922
 Strobilocephalus Baer, 1932
 Tetrabothrius Rudolphi, 1819
 Trigonocotyle Baer, 1932

References

Eucestoda
Platyhelminthes orders